The Schreyeralm Formation is a geologic formation in Austria and Germany. It preserves fossils dating back to the Triassic period.

See also 

 List of fossiliferous stratigraphic units in Austria
 List of fossiliferous stratigraphic units in Germany

References

External links 
 

Geologic formations of Austria
Geologic formations of Germany
Triassic System of Europe
Triassic Austria
Triassic Germany